Arachniotus is a genus of fungi within the family Gymnoascaceae.

Species
Arachniotus aurantiacus
Arachniotus candidus
Arachniotus ellipticosporus
Arachniotus flavoluteus
Arachniotus hebridensis
Arachniotus hyalotrichus
Arachniotus indicus
Arachniotus insolitus
Arachniotus lanatus
Arachniotus littoralis
Arachniotus punctatus
Arachniotus ruber
Arachniotus terrestris
Arachniotus trisporus
Arachniotus verruculosus

References

External links

Eurotiomycetes genera
Onygenales
Taxa named by Joseph Schröter
Taxa described in 1893